Samsung Galaxy Book Pro is a notebook computer announced by Samsung Electronics in April 2021. This device has a 13.3 inch display with 1080p display and 720p webcam.

References 

Samsung Galaxy
Computer-related introductions in 2021